Patrik Hellebrand (born 16 May 1999) is a Czech professional footballer who plays as a midfielder for SK Dynamo České Budějovice.

Career
He made his senior league debut for Zlín on 20 May 2017 in their 1–0 away loss at Dukla Prague, his only league match for the team. Upon the end of his youth contract in 2017, Hellebrand signed a professional contract with Zlín's regional rivals Slovácko.

Career statistics

Club

References

External links 
 
 Patrik Hellebrand official international statistics
 

Czech footballers
Czech Republic youth international footballers
1999 births
Living people
Association football midfielders
Czech First League players
FC Fastav Zlín players
1. FC Slovácko players
SK Slavia Prague players
SFC Opava players
SK Dynamo České Budějovice players